Georgia State Route 11 Business may refer to:

 Georgia State Route 11 Business (Gainesville): a business route that exists in Gainesville
 Georgia State Route 11 Business (Hawkinsville): a business route that exists in Hawkinsville
 Georgia State Route 11 Business (Jefferson): a business route that exists in Jefferson
 Georgia State Route 11 Business (Perry): a business route that exists in Perry

011 Business